Margarites argentatus is a species of sea snail, a marine gastropod mollusk in the family Margaritidae.

Margarites argentatus var. gigantea Leche, 1878 is accepted as Margarites giganteus (Leche, 1878)

Description
The height of the shell attains 3.5 mm. The small, thin shell is narrowly umbilicate. The spire is globose-depressed, and conoidal. It is subtransparent, corneous or bluish white in color. The surface is lusterless and dull. It is closely marked all over by fine, close-set spiral striae, scarcely visible except under a lens.  The blunt apex minute. The four whorls are tumid. The suture is deeply impressed. The circular aperture is oblique. The outer lip is simple and acute. The inner lip is arcuate, a trifle reflexed. The narrow umbilicus is deep.

Distribution
This marine species occurs off the west coast of Scotland and in the northwest Atlantic Ocean.

References

 Gould, A. A. 1841. Report on the Invertebrata of Massachusetts.  xiii + 373 pp. Commissioners on the Zoological and Botanical Survey of the State: Cambridge, Massachusetts.
 Leche, W. 1878. Öfversigt öfver de af Svenska Expeditionerna till Novaja Semlja och Jenissej 1875 och 1876 Insamlade: Hafs-Mollusker. Kongliga Svenska Vetenskaps-Akademiens Handlingar (2)16(2): 1-86, pls. 1–2.
 Hayward, P.J.; Ryland, J.S. (Ed.) (1990). The marine fauna of the British Isles and North-West Europe: 1. Introduction and protozoans to arthropods. Clarendon Press: Oxford, UK. . 627 pp.
 Trott, T.J. 2004. Cobscook Bay inventory: a historical checklist of marine invertebrates spanning 162 years. Northeastern Naturalist (Special Issue 2): 261 - 324. 
 Turgeon, D.D., et al. 1998. Common and scientific names of aquatic invertebrates of the United States and Canada. American Fisheries Society Special Publication 26 page(s): 60

argentatus
Gastropods described in 1841